Aleksandra Zaremba Kupiec (born 19 February 2001) is a professional footballer who plays as a midfielder for Spanish Liga F club UD Granadilla Tenerife. Born in Poland, she has represented Spain at youth levels.

Club career
Zaremba has played for Granadilla in Spain.

International career
Zaremba has represented the Canary Islands at youth levels. She has been called up to the Spain women's national under-19 football team.

Personal life
Zaremba was granted Spanish citizenship in November 2019.

References

External links

2001 births
Living people
Footballers from Warsaw
Polish women's footballers
Women's association football midfielders
Polish emigrants to Spain
Naturalised citizens of Spain
People from Tenerife
Sportspeople from the Province of Santa Cruz de Tenerife
Footballers from the Canary Islands
Spanish women's footballers
UD Granadilla Tenerife players
Primera División (women) players
Spanish people of Polish descent